Mariam Saidulloevna Nabieva (c. 1937 – 28 December 2017) was the First Lady of Tajikistan from 1991 until 1992 and the wife of the country's first elected president, Rahmon Nabiyev.

Death
Nabieva died from smoke inhalation during a fire at her home in Khujand, Tajikistan, on 28 December 2017. She was 80 years old. The cause of the fire was investigated as a possible arson.

References

Date of birth unknown
1930s births
2017 deaths
First Ladies of Tajikistan
20th-century Tajikistani women politicians
20th-century Tajikistani politicians
People from Khujand
Deaths from fire
Accidental deaths in Tajikistan